The Hirth HM 500 was a German four-cylinder air-cooled inverted inline engine developed from the Hirth HM 504 in 1938. Although developing the same output of the HM 504 (105 hp) and keeping the same capacity and bore, the HM 500 was a very different engine; the new HM 500 had a one-piece "closed" crankcase for simplified manufacture. The new cooling system reduced cylinder temperatures considerably (15 °C less), and the fuel consumption was also reduced. The HM 500 carried a twin-magneto instead of the two separate magnetos as on the old HM 504. All these changes made that the HM 500 resulted a 12% lighter than the HM 504 and the front surface 37% less than the previous HM 504.

Otherwise the HM 500 continued the typical Hirth use of built-up crankshafts and roller-bearings for crankshaft & connecting rods (Hirth patents) as well as magnesium-alloy crankcases which made Hirth engines so popular in the 1930s.

Due to low fuel consumption and excellent reliability, the HM 500 was chosen as the powerplant for the Bücker Bü 181.

Applications
 Bücker Bü 181

Specifications (HM 500A)

See also

References

Notes

Bibliography

Der Hirth Flugmotor HM 500, 1944
''Die Entwicklung der Hirth-Motoren, 1942

External links

Göbler-Hirthmotoren Company website

Hirth aircraft engines
Air-cooled aircraft piston engines
1930s aircraft piston engines
Inverted aircraft piston engines